The inaugural Dutch Supercup was held on 25 June 1949 at the Goffertstadion in Nijmegen. The match featured the 1948–49 winners of the league title SVV, and, the winners of the 1948–49 KNVB Cup, Quick 1888. Both goals were scored in the second half.

The match was held to commemorate the forty-year existence of the Nijmegen section of the KNVB. There would not be another Dutch Supercup held until 1991.

Match details

External links
 Scanned pages of Match Program 

1949
Netherlands Supercup
Supercup
Dutch Supercup